This is season-by-season results for the Western Kentucky Hilltoppers basketball team.

Season-by-season results

BOLD indicates lead the NCAA in victories.
NCAA – National Collegiate Athletic Association
NIT – National Invitation Tournament
NCBT – National Campus Basketball Tournament
NIBT – National Intercollegiate Basketball tournament
* 1971 NCAA appearance, including 4 tournament wins, vacated by the NCAA

Rankings

The Associated Press (AP) began publishing a national college basketball poll during the 1948–49 season.  The Coaches Poll began during the 1950–51 season.  The highest that Western Kentucky has been ranked in the AP poll is number 3 (1949, 1954, and 1967); the highest they have been ranked in the Coaches poll is 4th in 1954.  The AP poll was a top 20 poll from 1949 to 1960; a top 10 poll from 1961 to 1968; a top 20 from 1969 to 1989; and a top 25 poll since 1990. The Coaches poll started as a top 20 poll in 1950 and remained such until 1991 when it became a top 25 poll.  Below is the team's highest ranking and final season ranking for each poll (it does not include times when Western Kentucky was listed as “receiving votes”).

References

 
Western Kentucky
Western Kentucky Hilltoppers basketball seasons